Abbanakuppe is a village in the southern state of Karnataka, India. It is located in the Ramanagara taluk of Ramanagara district in Karnataka.
It hosts the Bidadi Industrial Area, and Toyota Kirloskar and Coca-Cola have factories in the village.

See also
 Bangalore Rural
 Districts of Karnataka

References

Villages in Bangalore Rural district